Hallucinating is the debut studio album by British industrial metal band Apartment 26.

Track listing

Personnel 
 Terrance "Biff" Butler – vocals
 Jon Greasley – guitar
 Louis Cruden – bass
 Andy "A.C". Huckvale – programming, keyboards
 Kevin Temple – drums

References

External links 
 

2000 debut albums
Albums produced by Ulrich Wild
Nu metal albums by English artists